State Route 219 (SR-219) is a state highway in the U.S. state of Utah.

Route description
Route 219 begins at the western city limits of Enterprise and runs east along Main Street for  until it ends at SR-18 on the east side of town.

History
On September 28, 1984, the city officials of Enterprise, and the county officials of Washington County signed a resolution to delete then Utah State Route 307 at Gunlock State Park in exchange for adding Main Street in Enterprise to the state highway system. This resolution was officially approved by the 1985 Utah State Legislature.

Of note is that former Utah State Route 120 also connected Enterprise to SR-18, but instead of ending at the western city limits, it continued to the Nevada border via Terry's Ranch. This route was originally added in 1941 as a branch of SR-18 from Enterprise west to Nevada, where SR 75 continued as a shortcut to Panaca, but was split off as SR-120 in 1945. SR-120 was among a number of state highways deleted by the Utah State Legislature in 1969.

Major intersections

References

219
 219
Streets in Utah